Femi Temowo (born 15 September 1976) is a Nigerian-born British jazz guitarist, musical director, producer, and broadcaster.

Career
Temowo was born in 1976 in Akure, Nigeria, and moved to London at the age of 10. He began playing guitar when he was 17 and was playing professionally by the age of 21.

Temowo also moonlights as a broadcaster, hosting Jazz Alive twice weekly on the Premier Gospel radio station.

Temowo released his debut solo album, Quiet Storm, in 2006 on his label, Femitone Music. He explains that while connected to his Nigerian roots, he was exploring his cultural background from the perspective of someone born in Nigeria but living as a British person in the UK.

References

External links 

 Femi Temowo official website

1976 births
21st-century guitarists
Alumni of Leeds College of Music
Alumni of Middlesex University
Living people
Nigerian emigrants to the United Kingdom
Nigerian guitarists
Nigerian jazz musicians
People from Akure
British world music musicians
Yoruba musicians
Yoruba-language singers